AS

Emmanuel Edmond (born 13 June 1996) is a Nigerian footballer who plays as a forward.

Career
On 14 August 2014, Edmond signed a three-year contract for the Slovak side AS Trenčín. He made his debut for AS Trenčín on 17 August 2014 against Košice, entering in as a substitute in place of Patrik Mišák in the 57th minute of the match. Edmond played in the Czech First League for FK Dukla Prague in the 2016–17 season.

References

External links
 AS Trenčín profile
 
 Futbalnet profile
 Fortuna liga profile

1996 births
Living people
Nigerian footballers
Nigerian expatriate footballers
Association football forwards
AS Trenčín players
FK Dukla Prague players
Czech First League players
Slovak Super Liga players
Expatriate footballers in Slovakia
Expatriate footballers in the Czech Republic
Nigerian expatriate sportspeople in Slovakia
Nigerian expatriate sportspeople in the Czech Republic